Yukou Area is an area and a town on the eastern side of Pinggu District, Beijing, China. It shares border with Dongshaoqu and Liujiadian Towns to the north, Wangxinzhuang and Daxingzhuang Towns to the east, Machangying Town to the south, as well as Zhang and Longwantun Towns to the west. It was home to 28,385 people as of 2020. 

The name of the Area Yukou refers to its location at the entrance of mountain valleys to the north.

History

Administrative divisions 
So far in 2021, Yukou Area is composed of 20 subdivisions, with 1 community and 19 villages. The subdivisions are listed in the following table:

See also 

 List of township-level divisions of Beijing

References 

Pinggu District
Towns in Beijing
Areas of Beijing